San Siro is a vast district ("quartiere") of Milan, Italy, part of the Zone 7 administrative division of the city. About 5 km north-west of the city centre, it borders the districts of Lampugnano, QT8, FieraMilano, and Trenno.

History
Until the 19th century, San Siro was a small settlement, on the banks of the Olona river; its centre was in the surroundings of what is now Piazzale Lotto. The area has been radically transformed in the 20th century.

San Siro is a very diverse district, with wide green areas and cemented neighbourhoods, low-income and high-income housing, villas and apartment blocks. Most of the buildings in the area date back to the mid 20th century.

The district is also characterized by prominent sports structures, most notably the Giuseppe Meazza football stadium, home of A.C. Milan and Inter Milan. It also houses the most important Milanese hippodrome, as well as other horse racing-related structures. The Palasport di San Siro arena, mainly used for basketball and volleyball games, was also in this district; it was closed in 1985 when its roof collapsed after a large snowfall.

References

Districts of Milan